Hemanta is a 2016 Bengali language drama thriller film directed by Anjan Dutt. It stars Parambrata Chatterjee in the role of the titular protagonist, with Jisshu Sengupta, Payel Sarkar, Gargi Roychowdhury, Saswata Chatterjee and Shantilal Mukherjee in other pivotal roles. The film is a modern-day adaptation of William Shakespeare's tragedy Hamlet, amidst a massive Bengal production house.

Plot synopsis
Set amidst the backdrop of the entertainment world of Bengali cinema production, the film is about Hemanta Sen who goes off to the United States at a young age to study film. Trained as a filmmaker, he comes back to learn that his father has died three years ago and also about his mother's relationship with his uncle.

Cast

Critical reception
Shamayita Chakraborty of The Times of India gave 3 stars and praised the performances of Parambrata Chatterjee, Jisshu Sengupta, Saswata Chatterjee and Sagnik Chatterjee while criticized the absence of the Ghost (Hamlet) in the story.

References

2016 films
Films directed by Anjan Dutt
Bengali-language Indian films
2010s Bengali-language films